Fairpoint is an unincorporated community in eastern Wheeling Township, Belmont County, Ohio, United States, along Wheeling Creek.  Although it is unincorporated, and at one point had a post office which was closed in recent years, with the ZIP code 43927.  It lies along State Route 9.

Fairpoint is part of the Wheeling, WV-OH Metropolitan Statistical Area.

History
The name Fairpoint is commendatory. A post office called Fairport was established in 1876. Besides the post office Fairpoint had a few country stores.

References

Unincorporated communities in Belmont County, Ohio
1876 establishments in Ohio
Populated places established in 1876
Unincorporated communities in Ohio